Qarah Din (also Romanized as Qarah Dīn and Qareh Dīn; also known as Qara Deh, Qarah Deh, and Qareh Deh) is a village in Pachehlak-e Gharbi Rural District, in the Central District of Azna County, Lorestan Province, Iran. At the 2006 census, its population was 63, in 14 families.

References 

Towns and villages in Azna County